Tankaman Rural District was in Tankaman District, Nazarabad County, Tehran province, Iran. At the 2006 census, its population was 16,310 in 4,135 households. It had 26 villages, the largest of which was Tankaman with 4,742 people. Tankaman had risen to city status by the time of the 2016 census, Nazarabad County had become a part of Alborz province, and the rural district was divided into Tankaman-e Jonubi Rural District and Tankaman-e Shomali Rural District.

References 

Nazarabad County

Rural Districts of Tehran Province

Populated places in Tehran Province

Populated places in Nazarabad County